Edward Morse Shepard (July 23, 1850 in New York City – July 28, 1911 in Lake George, Warren County, New York) was an American lawyer and politician from New York.

Early life and education 
Edward M. Shepard was the son of Lorenzo B. Shepard (1821–1856) and Lucy (Morse) Shepard (1821–1890). After the early death of his father, Abram S. Hewitt became his guardian, and the family removed to Brooklyn. There Shepard attended Public School Nr. 13. Afterwards he attended Oberlin College Preparatory School for one year (1860–61), and graduated from City College of New York in 1869. He then studied law with John Edward Parsons, was admitted to the bar in 1875, and formed a partnership with Albert Stickney. In 1890, he became a partner in the firm of Parsons, Shepard and Ogden.

Political career 
From 1883 to 1885, he was Chairman of the Brooklyn Civil Service Board. In 1884, he was appointed a State Forestry Commissioner. He became a Democratic leader in Brooklyn, but disagreeing with the corrupt local boss Hugh McLaughlin, Shepard organized in 1894 a Democratic Reform faction which nominated Everett P. Wheeler for Governor. In the election, Democrat David B. Hill was defeated by Republican Levi P. Morton.

Shepard was a delegate to the National Convention of the "Gold Democrats" in Indianapolis which nominated the Palmer/Buckner ticket for the 1896 United States presidential election. In 1897, Shepard supported Seth Low who ran on the Citizens Union ticket for Mayor of New York City at the first election under the Consolidation Charter, and said that Tammany Hall was the "most burning and disgraceful blot upon the municipal history of this country."

In 1900, Shepard supported William Jennings Bryan for president. The next year, Tammany boss Richard Croker had Shepard nominated as the regular Democratic candidate for Mayor of New York City, but he was defeated by Seth Low who had been nominated by a fusion of Anti-Tammany Democrats, Republicans and the Citizens Union.

Mark Twain, an avid supporter of Seth Low, said of Edward M. Shepard: "A Tammany banana is a strange thing. One end of it, or one part, here or there, is perfectly white. The rest of it is rotten. Now, I have the greatest respect for Mr. Shepard personally, but nine-tenths of the rest of the bananas on that ticket are rotten. Mr. Shepard is the white part of the banana. The best we can do is throw the whole banana from us, for it is unfit. It will make us sick. "

In 1909, he started a movement to unite the infighting factions of the Democratic Party in New York, which led in 1910 to the election of John Alden Dix  (the first Democratic Governor of New York since Roswell P. Flower had left office in 1894) and majorities in both Houses of the New York State Legislature (for the first time since 1893). Shepard had been considered the frontrunner for the gubernatorial nomination, but Tammany boss Charles Francis Murphy preferred Dix.

At the onset of 1911, the Democrats having a majority in the State Legislature, it was generally believed that Shepard would be elected U.S. Senator from New York to succeed Republican Chauncey M. Depew. But boss Murphy put up William F. Sheehan for the nomination, and the longest deadlock in the history of the State of New York ensued. At the United States Senate election in New York, 1911, Shepard was favored by the "Insurgent" Democrats, led by State Senator Franklin D. Roosevelt. He received 15 votes (out of 200) on the 32nd ballot, but retired from the race after the 34th ballot on February 25, 1911, trying to move Sheehan to do the same for the sake of party unity. But Sheehan remained in the field, and after 74 days of deadlock, James A. O'Gorman was elected as a compromise candidate on April 1.

Just a few months later, on July 28, 1911, Shepard died of pneumonia at his summer residence "Erlowest" (now The Inn at Erlowest), on Lake George's "Millionaire's Row." He had never married.

Shepard Hall of the City College of New York is named after him.

Works 

 Dishonor in American Public Life (1882)
 The Work of a Social Teacher (1884)
 Martin Van Buren (1888), in the “American Statesmen Series”
 The Democratic Party (1892)

See also 
 People v. the Brooklyn Cooperage Company
 John Jay McKelvey, Sr., Attorney, Founder of Harvard Law Review.

References

Bibliography

External links 
 
 

1850 births
1911 deaths
People from Brooklyn
Deaths from pneumonia in New York (state)
Oberlin College alumni
City College of New York alumni
New York (state) Democrats
Politicians from New York City
Burials at Green-Wood Cemetery
People from Lake George, New York
19th-century American lawyers